USS Sallie Wood was a 256-ton steamer captured  by the Union Navy during the early years of the American Civil War.

She assigned by the Union Navy during the blockade of ports and waterways of the Confederate States of America to a number of duties: as a tugboat, a dispatch boat, a troopship, and as an ammunition ship, mostly on the Mississippi River and its tributaries.

Service history 

Sallie Wood was a wooden steamer built in 1860 at Paducah, Kentucky. Early in the Civil War, she was acquired by the Confederate government and used as a troop transport on the Mississippi River and its tributaries.

On the 8th, they seized steamers, Sallie Wood and Muscle. The former was laden with iron intended for shipment to Richmond, Virginia. Moreover, the sweep of the Union gunboats had compelled retreating Confederate forces to burn three other Southern vessels lest they be captured.

In returning down stream, Muscle sprang a leak and sank; but Sallie Wood descended safely and was taken into the Western Flotilla for service as a transport, a tugboat, and an ammunition ship. While steaming along the navigable branches of the Mississippi River, Sallie Wood occasionally braved fire from masked riverside batteries. In July, as she ascended the Mississippi carrying sick soldiers, she was fired upon by Confederate cannon concealed ashore at Carolina Landing, at Princeton, and at other points above.

On the 21 July, attacks on the steamer were made from Argyle Landing and from Island No. 82. A shot during the latter ambush pierced her steam drum and left her dead in the water. Her pilot used the current to run her aground on the island, but the cannonade continued until all of the side wheeler's officers, crew, and passengers had been forced to leave the ship. The Confederates later removed whatever they could salvage and burned the steamer to her waterline.

See also 

Anaconda Plan

References 

Ships of the Union Navy
Ships built in Kentucky
Steamships of the United States Navy
Transports of the United States Navy
Tugs of the United States Navy
Dispatch boats of the United States Navy
Ammunition ships of the United States Navy
American Civil War auxiliary ships of the United States
1860 ships
Shipwrecks of the American Civil War
Maritime incidents in July 1862